The following is a timeline of the history of the city of Magdeburg, Germany.

Prior to 19th century

 937 -  (monastery) founded by Otto the Great.
 968
 Catholic Archbishopric of Magdeburg established.
  (monastery) founded.
 1010 - Volksfest begins.
 1018 -  (monastery) founded.
 1188 - Fire.
 1290 - Statue of Otto the Great erected in front of the town-hall.
 1294 - Magdeburg rights in effect.
 1297 - Freischiessen begins.
 1480 -  (church) rebuilt.
 1520 - Magdeburg Cathedral towers built.
 1524 - Protestant reformation.
 1525 -  (library) founded.
 1550
 Magdeburg Confession issued in response to the Augsburg Interim.
 Magdeburg besieged by forces of Maurice, Elector of Saxony.
 1631 - May: Sack of Magdeburg during the Thirty Years' War; city burned by Tilly.(de)
 1680 - Duchy of Magdeburg established.
 1685 - Huguenot refugee French Colony of Magdeburg develops.
 1691 -  (city hall) rebuilt.
 1702 -  built.
 1721 -  construction begins.
 1780 - Population: 22,389.(de)
 1783 -  (cultural association) founded.

19th century
 1806 - Siege of Magdeburg (1806) by French forces; Magdeburg "annexed to the kingdom of Westphalia."
 1814 - Magdeburg becomes part of Prussia again.
 1815 - Administrative Regierungsbezirk Magdeburg (region) created.
 1818 - Prussian IV Army Corps headquartered in Magdeburg.
 1824 -  expanded.
 1825 -  (chamber of commerce) founded.

 1840
 Magdeburg-Leipzig railway built.
 Population: 50,898.(de)
 1843
 Magdeburg–Thale railway begins operating.
  (stock exchange) founded.
 1846 - Berlin–Magdeburg railway begins operating.
 1851 -  built.
 1855 -  machinery manufactory begins operating in nearby Buckau.
 1860 -  opens.
 1866 -  (city hall) enlarged.
 1867 -  becomes part of Magdeburg.
 1873 - Magdeburg Hauptbahnhof (train station) opens.
 1876 - Stadttheater Magdeburg (theatre) opens.
 1877 - Soldiers' Memorial erected.
 1885 - Population: 114,291.(de)
 1886
  becomes part of Magdeburg.
  erected.
 1887 - Buckau becomes part of Magdeburg.
 1890 - Volksstimme newspaper begins publication.
 1895 - Population: 214,424.
 1896
 SV Victoria 96 Magdeburg (football club) formed.
 Gruson-Gewächshäuser (greenhouse garden) opens.

20th century

 1903 -  (bridge) opens.
 1905 - Population: 240,661.
 1906 - Kulturhistorisches Museum Magdeburg founded.
 1907
 Zentraltheater (theatre) opens.
  (city hall) new building constructed.
 1908 -  becomes part of Magdeburg.
 1917 - Polish leader Józef Piłsudski and close associate Kazimierz Sosnkowski imprisoned in Magdeburg.
 1918 - Piłsudski and Sosnkowski released.
 1919 - Population: 285,856.
 1934
  (park) opens.
 City hosts the 1934 European Aquatics Championships.
 1938 - November: Kristallnacht pogrom against Jews.
 1939 - Nazi camp for Sinti and Romani people established (see also Porajmos).
 1942 -  (labor camp) built.
 1944
 14 June: Women subcamp of the Ravensbrück concentration camp established at the Polte ammunition factory. The prisoners were mostly Soviet, Polish, Ukrainian and Jewish.
 1 July: Province of Magdeburg established.
 1 September: Subcamp of Ravensbrück at the Polte ammunition factory converted into a subcamp of the Buchenwald concentration camp.
 3 November: Men subcamp of the Buchenwald concentration camp established at the Polte ammunition factory. The prisoners were mostly Jewish.
 1945
 16 January: Aerial  by Allied forces.
 13 April: Subcamps of Buchenwald at the Polte ammunition factory dissolved. Dozens of prisoners massacred by the Volkssturm and Hitler Youth. Surviving prisoners sent on death marches towards the Ravensbrück and Sachsenhausen concentration camps.
 18 April: City occupied by United States forces.
 1 July: City occupied by Soviet forces.
 1949 - City becomes part of the German Democratic Republic.
 1955
 Ernst Grube Stadium opens.
 SC Magdeburg (sport club) formed.

 1965
 1. FC Magdeburg (football club) formed.
  (bridge) opens.
 1974 - S-Bahn Mittelelbe (city railway) begins operating.
 1987 -  active.
 1990
 City becomes part of reunited nation of Germany.
  becomes mayor.
 1991
 Regional Landtag of Saxony-Anhalt (legislature) begins meeting in Magdeburg.
  (school) established.
 1993 - Otto-von-Guericke University Magdeburg established.
 1994 - Municipal election held.(de)
 1996 -  (bridge) built.
 1997 - GETEC Arena opens.
 1998
 March: Alliance '90/The Greens conference held in Magdeburg.(de)
 1999
 Jahrtausendturm (tower) built.
  monorail begins operating.
 National Bundesgartenschau (garden show) held in the Elbauenpark.

21st century

 2001
 Lutz Trümper becomes mayor.
  (archives) established.
 2003 - Magdeburg Water Bridge opens near city.
 2006 - MDCC-Arena opens.
 2010 -  (transit entity) established.
 2013 - June: Flood.
 2015 - Population: 238,212.(de)

See also
 Magdeburg history (de)
 List of mayors of Magdeburg (in German)
  (en)
 
 History of Saxony-Anhalt

Other cities in the state of Saxony-Anhalt:(de)
 Timeline of Halle (Saale)

References

This article incorporates information from the German Wikipedia.

Bibliography

in English

in German
 
 
 
 
 
 
  2000–2009. (4 vols.)

External links

 Items related to Magdeburg, various dates (via Europeana)
 Items related to Magdeburg, various dates (via Digital Public Library of America)

 
Magdeburg